This is an episode listing of  which premiered across Japan on WOWOW broadcasting station from August 6, 2005, to February 18, 2006.

Episode list

References

 WOWOW's Guyver official website'' 

Guyver